Tulare may refer to:

 , a United States Navy attack cargo ship in commission from 1956 to 1986

Places

Serbia
 Tulare, Medveđa
 Tulare (Prokuplje)

United States
 Tulare, California
 Tulare, South Dakota
 Tulare County, California
 Tulare Lake, south Central Valley, California
 Tulare Lake (Alameda County), east Amador Valley, California

See also